Maria Macahig Memorial High School or MMMHS, formerly known as Bonawon Barangay High School, is public national high school located in Bonawon, Siaton, Negros Oriental. The school follows the Basic Education Curriculum-Restructured ( BEC-R). The advent of the BEC-R brings lights and shadows to the curriculum. It is the oldest public high school in the municipality of Siaton. Situated about 69 km from Dumaguete, and about 19 km from the municipality proper.

About

History
Maria Macahig Memorial High School is named after the late mother of the donor, Cristita P. Macahig.  MMMHS started its operation in 1970. It was first known as Bonawon Barangay High School. It opens its door to high school students not only from barangay Bonawon, but also to the neighboring barangays and Municipalities.

Vision
Maria Macahig Memorial High School, is an educational institution fully equipped with modern functional facilities, envisions to develop and produce value-oriented, environment friendly, technologically motivated, and globally competitive individuals who could carry out great tasks and responsibilities to their own families and communities.

Mission
Uplift quality education for the students to become trustworthy leaders in the future who developed skills, abilities, habits, knowledge and wisdom through competent and adequately trained teachers with participation of stockholders to school programs, projects and activities to bring progress to the school as well as to the community.

Campus life
The whole campus is totally green in color not of the paint but because of the green grass and trees growing in the campus premises. As a matter of fact, the school won as the greenest campus couple of years ago.

The school has a school paper named "The Lampara" which is circulated every school year.

Various activities are celebrated every month in the campus grounds.

The school also participates in different contests (sports, mathematics, science, literary, etc.) in provincial, regional and even in national level.

References

High schools in Negros Oriental
Educational institutions established in 1970
1970 establishments in the Philippines